Amilale Esaroma is a Samoan footballer who plays as a forward.

References

External links
 

Living people
1985 births
Samoan footballers
2012 OFC Nations Cup players
Samoa international footballers
Association football forwards